Idaea filicata is a moth of the family Geometridae. It is found in Southern Europe and the Near East.

The species has a wingspan of 12–21 mm. The adults fly at night from May to September in two to three generations.

External links

Fauna Europaea
Lepiforum.de

Sterrhini
Moths of Europe
Moths of Asia
Moths described in 1798
Taxa named by Jacob Hübner